The decline of Christianity in the Western world is the decreasing Christian affiliation in the Western world. While most countries in the Western world were historically almost exclusively Christian, the post-World War II era has seen developed countries with modern, secular educational facilities shifting towards post-Christian, secular, globalized, multicultural and multifaith societies. While Christianity is currently the predominant religion in Latin America, Europe, Canada and the United States, the religion is declining in many of these areas, including Western Europe, North America, and Oceania. A decline in Christianity among countries in Latin America's Southern Cone has also contributed to a rise in irreligion in Latin America.

Pew Research Center (PEW) has found a retention rate among Western European Christians closer to 83% (ranging from 57% in the Netherlands to 91% in Austria), however, the overwhelming majority of those who have left Christianity in Western Europe now identify as religiously unaffiliated. More recent study published in 2022 by Pew Research Center, have found a retention rate among American Christians closer to 67%, and cited that the decline of Christianity is primarily due to people leaving Christianity and choosing to have no religious affiliation (rather than due to people converting to other religions). Pew Research Center projects that Christians will make up less than half of the American population by 2070, with estimated ranges for that year falling between 35% and 46% of the American population (down from 64% in 2022 and from 91% in 1976).

Background
According to a 2012 Pew Research Center survey, throughout the next four decades, Christianity will remain the world's largest religion. It is also expected that Christianity may have the largest net losses in terms of religious conversion. Religious conversions are projected to have a "modest impact on changes in the Christian population" worldwide between 2010 and 2050; and may negatively affect the growth of Christian population and its share of the world's populations "slightly". However, these forecasts lack reliable data on religious conversion in China, but according to media reports and expert assessments, it is possible that the rapid growth of Christianity in China may maintain, or even increase, the current numerical advantage of Christianity as the largest religion in the world. In the United States, there have been some conversions to Christianity among those who grew up non-religious but it has not been in numbers that make up for those who were raised Christian and became religiously unaffiliated later in life.

Scholars have proposed that Church institutions decline in power and prominence in most industrialized societies, except in cases in which religion serves some function in society beyond merely regulating the relationship between individuals and God. Developing countries in Latin America and Africa are not experiencing decline mostly because of religious conversion in those countries where the Church offers broad social support services. Together with the decline of Western Christians, increasing numbers of Christians in the global South will form a "new Christendom" in which the majority of the world's Christian population will be found in the South. According to various scholars and sources Pentecostalism – a Protestant Christian movement – is the fastest growing religion in the world, this growth is primarily due to religious conversion.

The European Values Study found that in most European countries in 2008, the majority of young respondents identified themselves as Christians. Unlike Western Europe, in Central and Eastern European countries the proportion of Christians has been stable or even increased in the post-communist era. A large majority (83%) of those who were raised as Christians in Western Europe still identify as such. While the remainder mostly self-identify as religiously unaffiliated. Christianity is still the largest religion in Western Europe, where 71% of Western Europeans identified themselves as Christian, according to a 2018 study by the Pew Research Center.

A 2015 analysis of the European Values Study in the Handbook of Children and Youth Studies identified a "dramatic decline" in religious affiliation across Europe from 1981 to 2008, however, according to the same analysis "the majority of young respondents in Europe claimed that they belonged to a Christian denomination".

In 2017, a report released by St. Mary's University, London concluded that Christianity "as a norm" was gone for at least the foreseeable future. In at least 12 out of the 29 European countries surveyed by the researchers, based on a sample of 629 people, the majority of young adults reported that they were not religious. The data was obtained from two questions, one asking "Do you consider yourself as belonging to any particular religion or denomination?" to the full sample and the other one asking "Which one?" to the sample who replied with "Yes". The Pew Research Center criticized the methodology of two-step approach: "Presumably, this is because some respondents who are relatively low in religious practice or belief would answer the first question by saying they have no religion, while the same respondents would identify as Christian, Muslim, Jewish, etc., if presented with a list of religions and asked to choose among them. The impact of these differences in question wording and format may vary considerably from country to country".

In 2018 the Pope lamented the ongoing trend of re-purposing churches, some being used for pizza joints, skate parks, strip clubs and bars. In Germany 500 Catholic churches have closed since 2000. Canada has lost 20% of its churches in this time frame. This is the result of lack of willing clergy to staff churches and inability to meet costs. After a scandal in Naples where a deconsecrated church became the venue for a Halloween party featuring scantily clad witches seated on the former altar, Pope Francis, acknowledging the decline in Church attendance, implored that the deconsecrated churches be placed in service to fulfill the social needs of caring for the poor. In a new study published in 2022, Pew Research Center projects that if the rate of switching continues to accelerate (primarily to no religious affiliation), Christians will make up less than half of the American population by 2070, with estimated ranges for that year falling between 35% and 46% of the American population (down from 64% in 2022 and from 91% in 1976). The same study have found that a retention rate among American Christians closer to 67%, with one-third of those who were Christian in childhood leaving the religion by age 30.

Europe
According to Scholars, in 2017, Europe's population was 77.8% Christian (up from 74.9% 1970), these changes were largely result of the collapse of Communism and switching to Christianity in the former Soviet Union and Eastern Bloc countries. According to the 2019 Eurobarometer survey, Christianity was the largest religion in the European Union accounting 64% of the EU population, down from 72% in 2012.

In 2017, Pew Research Center have found that the number of Christians in Europe, is in decline. This mainly because of the number of deaths is estimated to exceed the number of births among European Christians, in addition to lower fertility and switching to no religious affiliation.

In 2018, Pew Research Center have found a retention rate among Western European Christians of around 83% (ranging from 57% in the Netherlands to 91% in Austria). Despite the decline in Christian affiliation in Western Europe, Christianity is still the largest religion in Western Europe, where 71% of Western Europeans identified themselves as Christian, according to a 2018 study by the Pew Research Center. Unlike Western Europe, in Central and Eastern European countries the proportion of Christians has been stable or even increased in the post-communist era.

In Western Europe, Christians have relatively low retention rates in the Netherlands (57%), Norway (62%), Belgium and Sweden (65%); the majority of those who have left Christianity in these countries now identify as religiously unaffiliated. Meanwhile Christians have relatively high retention rates in Austria (91%), Switzerland and Italy (90%), and Ireland and the United Kingdom (89%). The proportion of respondents who currently identify as Christian has been decline in Czech Republic and Slovakia, meanwhile, the proportion of respondents who currently identify as Christian has stable or even increased in the rest of the Central and Eastern European countries.

Austria
Austria is predominantly Christianity, adhered to by 68.2% of the country's population according to the 2021 national survey conducted by Statistics Austria. Among Christians, 80.9% were Catholics, 7.2% were Orthodox Christians (mostly belonging to the Eastern Orthodox Church), 5.6% were Protestants, while the remaining 6.2% were other Christians, belonging to other denominations of the religion or not affiliated to any denomination.  and 22.4% declared they did not belong to any religion, denomination or religious community.

France
Christianity has been declining in France steadily since the 1980s. In 2021, a French poll showed that over half of French citizens do not believe in God or consider Christianity to be relevant. People who identified as Catholic declined from 81% in 1986 to 47% in 2020, while the number of people who identified as not religious rose from 16% to 40%. In 2021 around 50% of all French respondents identified as Christians.

Finland
In Finland, 78.4% of the population practised Christianity, and the figure decreased to 67.7% in 2021, about a 10 digit decrease in a decade. The number of church members leaving the Church saw a particularly large increase during the fall of 2010. This was caused by statements regarding homosexuality and same-sex marriage – perceived to be intolerant towards LGBT people – made by a conservative bishop and a politician representing Christian Democrats in a TV debate on the subject.

Germany
In 2020 around 54% of the German population were Christians among them 51% members of the two large Christian churches. Attendance and membership in both Catholic and Protestant churches in Germany have been declining for several decades. As of 2021, less than half of German citizens belong to a church for the first time in the country's history, around 52.7% of the population were Christians among them 49.7% members of the two large Christian churches. Around 360,000 Catholics left the church in 2021 alone, and about 280,000 people have left Protestant churches. In 2017, Pew Research Center have found that the number of deaths is estimated to exceed the number of births among German Christians by nearly 1.4 million.

Hungary
According to some sources Christianity is declining in Hungary. Although a majority of Hungarians identify as Catholic, only 12% regularly attend church. On the other hand, a series of surveys conducted by Pew Research Center in 2018 found that the share of Christians has remained fairly stable in Hungary (75% say they were raised Christian versus 76% say they are Christian now).

Ireland
Christianity, specifically Catholicism, remains the predominant religion in the Republic of Ireland. In the 2016 census, 85.1% of the population identified as Christian. However, recent social changes, including the lifting of a ban on abortion and the legalizing of same sex marriage, have solidified the growth of liberal thinking in Ireland, particularly within the younger community. An Irish priest, Fr. Kevin Hegarty, asserted in 2018 that the church's authority was undermined by the papal encyclical, called , that established the Church's opposition to contraception. He reported that there is only one priest under the age of 40 in the entire diocese of Killala; only two priests have been ordained over the last 17 years, and there have been no candidates for the priesthood since 2013. Hegarty blames this decline on the Church's positions on female ordination, contraception and sexuality. A continued requirement for children entering Irish Catholic owned schools to be baptized keeps the overall level of baptisms high, though the number of individuals practicing a faith or attending church is decreasing.

Netherlands
The Netherlands has tolerated greater religious diversity among Christian sects than Scandinavian countries where "automatism" (default registration in the Lutheran Church by birth) has been the norm. Non-denominationalism increased in the Netherlands during the 19th century. This process slowed between the 1930s and 1960s, after which non-denominational affiliation increased at very high levels. The Church's ministry to the poor was not needed in the modern Netherlands that had developed systems of government welfare and secular charity. The declining influence of religious institutions in public life allowed great religious, philosophical and theological pluralism in the private and individual spheres of Dutch society. During the 1960s and 1970s, pillarization began to weaken and the population became less religious. In 1971, 39% of the Dutch population were members of the Roman Catholic Church; by 2014, their share of the population had dropped to 23.3% (church-reported KASKI data), or to 23.7% (large sample survey by Statistics Netherlands in 2015). The proportion of adherents of Calvinism and Methodism declined in the same period from 31% to 15.5%. In 2022, the diocese of Amsterdam announced that 60% of Catholic churches (approximately 100 churches total) would be closing there in the next five years.

In 2015, Statistics Netherlands, the government institute that gathers statistical information about the Netherlands, found that Christians comprised 43.8% of the total population. With only 49.9% of the Dutch currently (2015) adhering to a religion, the Netherlands is one of the least religious countries of the European Union, after the Czech Republic and Estonia. By the 1980s, religion had largely lost its influence on Dutch politics and as a result Dutch policy on women's rights, abortion, euthanasia, homosexuality and prostitution became very liberal in the 1980s and 1990s. In 2004 these groups merged to form the Protestant Church in the Netherlands.

In 2015, 63% of Dutch people think that religion does more harm than good. A quarter of the population thinks that morality is threatened if no one believes in God, down from 40% in 2006. The number of people reporting that they never pray rose from 36% in 2006 to 53% in 2016. In 2015, Statistics Netherlands, found that 50.1% of the adult population declared no religious affiliation.

Italy and Spain
Adherence to established forms of church-related worship is in rapid decline in Italy and Spain, and Church authority on social, moral and ethical issues has been reduced. Daily church attendance has declined but Catholicism still remains the predominant religion in Spain and Italy. According to the Spanish Center for Sociological Research, 60.2% of Spaniards self-identified as Catholic in 2020, According to a 2014 Pew Research Center study, 83.3% of Italy's residents are Christians.

United Kingdom
Attendance at Anglican churches had begun to decline in the United Kingdom by the Edwardian era, with both membership in mainstream churches and attendance at Sunday schools declining. Infant baptism declined after World War II. In 2014, Archbishop of Canterbury Rowan Williams stated that the UK had become a "post-Christian country". That same year, only 4.3% of the population participated in a Church of England (C of E) Christmas service. Nevertheless, around 60% of all respondents identified as Christians in the 2011 Census.

The Roman Catholic Church has witnessed the highest retention rate among all Christian denominations. In 2015, 9.2% of the UK population was Catholic. According to scholar Stephen Bullivant, based on the British Social Attitudes Survey and European Social Survey, the decline in Anglicanism has slowed thanks to "the return of patriotism and pride in Christianity", and the number of followers of the Anglican Church has increased slightly by 2017. In 2017, a report commissioned by the Christian group Hope Revolution indicated that 21% of British youth identified as "active followers of Jesus".

According to the 2018 British Social Attitudes Survey (BSA), 33% of over-75s identified as C of E, while only 1% of people aged 18−24 did so. The report stated that "Britain is becoming more secular not because adults are losing their religion but because older people with an attachment to the C of E and other Christian denominations are gradually being replaced in the population by younger unaffiliated people." Furthermore, it has been reported that fewer than half of Britons are expected to identify as Christian in the 2021 census.

Oceania

Australia
In the 2016 Census, the percentage of people belonging to some form of Christianity decreased to 52.2% from 61.1% in the 2011 Census. At the same time, population declaring that they had no religion increased to 30% up from 22% in 2011 Census. In a 2017 survey of teenage Australians aged 13–18, 52% declared that they had no religion, compared with 38% Christian, 3% Muslim, 2% Buddhist and 1% Hindu. The only form of Christianity that showed a significant growth in 2016 Census is the Pentecostal church, increased from 2.1% up from 1.7% in 2016. Most of the followers of the Pentecostal churches are young as the average age among them is 25.

New Zealand

In New Zealand, there has been an decrease in Christianity and increase in the population declaring "No religious affiliation". This reason for this is attributed to the decline in belief in institutional religion and increase in Secularism. In the 1991 census, 20.2% of the New Zealand population followed No religion. This proportion more than doubled in two decades, to reach 41.9% in the 2013 census , and the figure increased again to 48.2% in the 2018 census. At the same time, the Christian population declined from 47.65% in 2013 Census to 37.31% in 2018 Census. In the 2018 Census, the New Zealand population claiming "No religion" officially overtook Christianity.

North America

Canada
In 2021, Statistics Canada found that only 68% of Canadians 15 years and older reported having a religious affiliation, marking the first time the number had dipped below 70% since StatCan began tracking religious affiliation in 1985. Christianity remains the largest religion in Canada, in the 2016 census, 63.2% of the population identified as Christians.

In Quebec, since the Quiet Revolution, over 500 churches (20% of the total) have been closed or converted for non-worship based uses. In the 1950s, 95% of Quebec's population went to Mass; in the present day, that number is closer to 5%. Despite the decline in church attendance, Christianity remains the predominant religion in Quebec, where 82.2% of people were Christians, according to 2011 National Household Survey.

With the loss of Christianity's monopoly after having once been central and integral to Canadian culture and daily life, Canada has become a post-Christian, secular state.

United States
Christianity, the largest religion in the United States, experienced a 20th-century high of 91% of the total population in 1976. This had declined to 73.7% of the total population by 2016. By 2022, this number had declined further to 64%. In a new study published in 2022, Pew Research Center projects that if the rate of switching continues to accelerate (primarily to no religious affiliation), Christians will make up less than half of the American population by 2070, with estimated ranges for that year falling between 35% and 46% of the American population. The 2014 Religious Landscape Study found a large majority of those who were raised as Christians in the United States still identified as such (retention rate of 87.6% among those raised Christian), while the rest who no longer identify as Christians mostly identify as religiously unaffiliated. More recent study published in 2022 by Pew Research Center, have found a retention rate among American Christians closer to 67%, with one-third of those who were Christian in childhood leaving the religion by age 30. In 2019, 65% of American adults described themselves as Christians. In 2020, 47% of Americans said that they belonged to a church, down from 70% in 1999; this was the first time that a poll found less than half of Americans belonging to a church. Nationwide Catholic membership increased between 2000 and 2017, but the number of churches declined by nearly 11% and by 2019, the number of Catholics decreased by 2 million people, dropping from 23% of the population to 21%. Since 1970, weekly church attendance among Catholics has dropped from 55% to 20%, the number of priests declined from 59,000 to 35,000 and the number of people who have left Catholicism has increased from under 2 million in 1975 to over 30 million today. In 2022, there were fewer than 42,000 nuns left in the United States, a 76% decline over 50 years, with fewer than 1% of nuns under age 40. The Evangelical Lutheran Church in America (ELCA) lost about 30% of its congregation and closed 12.5% of its churches; the United Methodist church lost 16.7% of its congregation and 10.2% of its churches. The Presbyterian Church has had the sharpest decline in church membership: between 2000 and 2015 they lost over 40% of their congregation and 15.4% of their churches. Infant baptism has also decreased; nationwide, Catholic baptisms are down by nearly 34%, and ELCA baptisms by over 40%. The Southern Baptist Convention has experienced decline: between 2006 and 2020, they lost 2.3 million members, representing a 14% decrease in membership during that period. The Lutheran Church–Missouri Synod reported in 2021 that the denomination has been declining in membership. In 2020, the church reported approximately 1.8 million total baptized members, a decline from its peak in 1971 when it reported nearly 2.8 million total baptized members.

The 2014 Religious Landscape Study found a large majority of those who were raised as Christians in the United States still identify as such (retention rate of 87.6% among those raised Christian), while those who no longer identify as Christians mostly identify as religiously unaffiliated. More recent studies have found a retention rate closer to 67%, with one-third of those who were Christian in childhood leaving the religion by age 30. The 2014 study found that 84% of all adults who were raised as Historically Black Protestant continue to identify as such or identify now with a different Christian denominations, Evangelical protestant (81%), Mormon (76%), Catholic (75%), Orthodox Christian (73%), Mainline Protestant (70%), and Jehovah’s Witnesses (62%) continue to identify as such or identify now with a different Christian denominations. Significant minorities of those raised in nearly all Christian denominational families now say they are unaffiliated, ranging from 13% among those raised historically black Protestant to 35% of those raised Jehovah's Witnesses. A small minority of those raised in nearly all Christian denominational families identify now with another faith, ranging from 3% among those raised historically black Protestant, Evangelical Protestant, Mormon, Orthodox Christian and Jehovah's Witnesses to 4% of those raised Catholic and Mainline Protestant.

In 2018, the Minneapolis Star Tribune reported that churches in Minnesota were being closed due to dwindling attendance. Mainline protestant churches in Minnesota have seen the sharpest declines in their congregations. The Catholic Church has closed 81 churches between 2000 and 2017; the Archdiocese of Minneapolis closed 21 churches in 2010 and has had to merge dozens more. In roughly the same time frame, the Evangelical Lutheran Church in America in Minnesota has lost 200,000 members and closed 150 churches. The United Methodist Church, which is Minnesota's second-largest Protestant denomination, has closed 65 of its churches. In the early 1990s, the Archdiocese of Chicago closed almost 40 Catholic churches and schools. In 2016, increasing costs and priest shortages fueled plans to close or consolidate up to 100 Chicago Catholic churches and schools in the next 15 years. The Archdiocese of New York announced in 2014 that nearly one-third of their churches were merging and closing. The Archdiocese of Boston closed more than 70 churches between 2004 and 2019. In 2021, the Archbishop of Cincinnati announced that 70% of Catholic churches would be closing there in the next several years. Nationally, Catholic school enrollment has declined by more than 430,000 students since 2008.

Moderate and liberal denominations in the United States have been closing down churches at a rate three or four times greater than the number of new churches being consecrated. However, according to The Christian Century, the rate of annual closures is approximately 1% and quite low relative to other types of institutions. It has been asserted that of the approximately 3,700 churches that close each year, up to half are unsuccessful new churches. The more conservative evangelical denominations have also declined, representing 23% of population in 2006 and 14% in 2020 according to the Public Religion Research Institute.

The Orthodox Church (pre-denominational) and the denominations like Jehovah's Witnesses, the Church of Jesus Christ of Latter-day Saints and Pentecostals had slight increases in membership between 2003 and 2018 but the number of adults in the United States who do not report any religious affiliation nearly doubled over that period. However, in 2021, the Greek Orthodox Archdiocese of America, the largest Orthodox church in the United States, reported membership losses during a 40-year period. In 2015, Pew Research Center reported a 38% decline in membership from 2009 to 2014 among the Orthodox Churches in the United States.

The Public Religion Research Institute's 2020 Census of American Religion showed that the overall decline of white Christians in America had slowed, stabilizing at around 44% of the population, compared to 42% in 2019. The Public Religion Research Institute's 2020 Census of American Religion showed that 70% of Americans identify as Christian. It also showed that, contrary to expectations, white evangelicals had continued to decline and that they were now outnumbered by white mainline protestants. Conversely, the Pew Research Center found in 2022 that the decline had continued to accelerate over the previous fifty years.

An article written by Adam Gabbatt in April 2021 for the British newspaper The Guardian claimed that an "allergic reaction" to conservative Christians had caused the decline of the religion as a whole, primarily towards how certain conservative Christians generally do not support the advancement of LGBT rights and abortion rights, a perspective primarily shared by younger people like Millennials. Gabbatt and other researchers interviewed in the article particularly blame the Republican Party for pushing social conservative policies.

South America

Chile
Despite other countries of South and Central America and also Caribbean who had seen an increasing of religiosity the last 30 years, cases of sexual abuse, attempts to hide information, and interference in government affairs have been the main causes of the decline of Christianity in Chile. According to the public broadcaster TVN, the number of Chileans who declare themselves Catholics fell from 73% in 2008 to 45% in 2018. In addition, it is the Latin American country that has less trust (36%) in the Church throughout the region according to Latinobarómetro. 63% of the Chilean population profess some branch of Christianity, according to the Encuesta Nacional Bicentenario identifies as Christian, with an estimated 45% of Chileans declaring to be part of the Catholic Church and 18% of Pentecostal churches. 5% of the population adheres to other religion.

Attempts to restore the Roman Catholic Christian faith in Chile have failed. The Argentine newspaper Clarín reported that Pope Francis's State visit to Chile in 2018 "had been the worst in his five years of pontificate." After the papal visit, the crisis in the Chilean Catholic Church increased. According to the  survey, atheism has grown from 21% in 2018 to 32% in 2019 and then to 36% in 2020. Despite the decline of Roman Catholic church, Pentecostalism still maintains the same percentage of adherents since 2012.

See also

Church attendance
Irreligion
Postchristianity
Secularization

Notes

References

Christianity and society
Disengagement from religion
Postmodernism
Criticism of Christianity
Secularism
Western culture